The following is a list of ambassadors of the United States, or other chiefs of mission, to Guatemala. The title given by the United States State Department to this position is currently Ambassador Extraordinary and Plenipotentiary.

See also
Foreign relations of Guatemala
Ambassadors of the United States

References

 
United States Department of State: Background notes on Guatemala

External links
 United States Department of State: Chiefs of Mission for Guatemala
 United States Department of State: Guatemala
 United States Embassy in Guatemala

Guatemala
 
United States